François Simonau (26 May 1783 – 26 November 1859) was a painter, born in what is now Belgium, who made his career in London. He was the teacher, and later stepfather, of Emma Soyer.

Life and career
Simonau was born in Bornhem, a town now in the Belgian province of Antwerp, on 26 May 1783. He studied in Bruges (with either Robert Frickx or Bernard Friex, according to different sources) and between 1808 and 1812 was a pupil of Antoine-Jean Gros in Paris. In 1815 he settled in London together with his brother Pierre. The latter established a successful lithographic business; François concentrated on portrait-painting, with the help of Sir Thomas Lawrence, who introduced him to London society. He prospered, and exhibited at the Royal Academy and the British Institution from 1818. 

Simonau supplemented his commissions with a small but flourishing art school in Commercial Road, east of the City of London. Among his pupils was Emma Jones. In 1818 her mother, Elizabeth Jones, a wealthy widow, offered Simonau sufficient financial inducement to drop his other students and concentrate entirely on her daughter. In 1820 Simonau and Elizabeth Jones were married. They settled in Greek Street, Soho, with Emma and her brother Newton.

In 1835 the chef Alexis Soyer asked Simonau to paint his portrait; Simoneau delegated the task to his stepdaughter. Soyer fell in love with her, she soon reciprocated, and to Simonau's chagrin – "a mere cook!" – they married in 1837. After Elizabeth Simonau died in 1839 Simonau went to live with the Soyers at their flat in Charing Cross Road.

Simonau outlived his stepdaughter and her husband, and in his last years was in reduced circumstances. Lord Palmerston arranged a pension for him. He died on 26 November 1859; as he had wished, he was buried at Kensal Green cemetery alongside his stepdaughter and her husband.

Works
According to Grove Art Online, the neo-classical style was predominant in painting in Belgium in Simonau's early years, but he distanced himself from it, partly because of his training with Gros in Paris and partly  under the influence of the art of his adopted country:

Léonce Bénédite, in La peinture au 19iéme siècle (1909) wrote: 

Bénédite added that it was perhaps to Gros that Simonau owes the warmth of his colour.

References

Sources

1783 births
1859 deaths
19th-century Belgian painters